Lift Kara De is an Indian reality television series hosted by Bollywood film director, Karan Johar. The series premiered on 1 January 2010 and ended on 15 May 2010.

Hosts

Karan Johar as Host
Aishwarya Sakhuja as co-Host

Note: Due to low TRP's and Indian Premier League (Cricket), the channel shifted the show from 2 days (Friday and Saturday) to 1 day (only Saturday) starting 27 February 2010. The show was turned into a 90 minutes one-evening show from a 60 minutes two-evenings show.

References

Indian television talk shows
2010 Indian television series debuts
Indian television series
Sony Entertainment Television original programming